Two ships of the United States Navy have borne the name USS Hartford, named in honor of Hartford, the capital of Connecticut.

 , was a sloop-of-war, commissioned in 1859 and finally disposed of in 1957.

United States Navy ship names